Visulahti is a dinosaur themed amusement park and tourist center opened in 1980 in Mikkeli, Finland, along the Lake Saimaa and the Kuopio Highway. It is similar to Tervakoski's Puuhamaa as there are no traditional amusement park equipment. It consists of three areas: Dinosauria, HyperDino and Visulahti Wax Cabinet. The Dinosauria has two different swimming pools and three large water slides. Visulahti also has accommodation and a camping site. Visulahti is owned by the Spanish Aspro Ocio S.A. through Puuharyhmä Oyj, which it acquired in 2007.

References

External links
 Official Website

Mikkeli
Amusement parks in Finland
Tourist attractions in South Savo
Aspro Parks attractions
1980 establishments in Finland
Amusement parks opened in 1980